Ulf Thorsell (18 March 1956 – 8 June 2021) was a male former international table tennis player from Sweden.

He won a bronze medal at the 1975 World Table Tennis Championships in the Swaythling Cup (men's team event) with Stellan Bengtsson, Kjell Johansson, Bo Persson and Ingemar Wikström for Sweden.

He won another bronze medal two years later at the 1977 World Table Tennis Championships in the Swaythling Cup (men's team event) with Bengtsson, Kjell Johansson, Ake Gronlund and Roger Lagerfeldt.

He also won two European Table Tennis Championships medals in 1976 and 1980.

See also
 List of table tennis players
 List of World Table Tennis Championships medalists

References

Swedish male table tennis players
Living people
1956 births
World Table Tennis Championships medalists